Timrå IK is a professional Swedish ice hockey team based in Timrå, north of Sundsvall. It competes in the Swedish Hockey League (SHL), which is the top-tier league in Sweden, since being promoted by winning 2021 SHL qualifiers. Previous seasons in the top Swedish division include 1956–57 to 1975–76, 1977–78, 1981–82, 2000–01 to 2012–13 and 2018–19. The team's home venue is NHC Arena with a capacity of 6,000 spectators.

The club was founded on 11 Maj 1928 as a boxing club and started the ice hockey section in 1937. Timrå are historically traditional rivals with MoDo Hockey since they both are situated in Västernorrland County and are playing in the professional ice hockey leagues in Sweden.

History
The club origins from Wifstavarfs GIF, founded in 1921, later relaunched as Wifstavarvs IK, in 1928, and Östrands IF, founded in 1931. Both clubs started playing ice hockey in 1938 and in the summer of 1942 they merged into Wifsta/Östrands IF, more commonly called W/Ö. W/Ö made its first Swedish Championship appearance in 1943. The championships were played independently from the national league at the time.

Five seasons later, 1948–49 the team was accepted for play in the national league system in Sweden.
Starting in third league, Wifsta/Östrands IF won nine out of ten games and directly advanced to second league or Division II Norra (North Division).

In the spring of 1956, having spent seven seasons facing teams like Brynäs IF, Mora IK and Leksands IF, W/Ö qualified for the top national league on March 10, 1956 as the top league, Division I, nicknamed Allsvenskan by many, was expanded from 6+6 to 8+8 teams, a North and South Division.

In 1963, the local club Fagerviks GF was absorbed and W/Ö was renamed Wifsta/Östrand–Fagerviks IF or simply WÖF.

Starting with the 1958–59 season, W/Ö was playing its home games on an artificial ice rink. Some years later an ice arena was built, and WÖF played its first indoor season 1965–66 under the roof of what is now NHK Arena. Just one year later, the lengthy name Wifsta/Östrand–Fagerviks IF was finally replaced by Timrå IK as of 1966–67.

Timrå IK continued to play successful hockey and stayed in the top league in Sweden until Elitserien was formed in 1975. Having finished last of the 10 teams, the club received their first relegation and was demoted after 20 years in the top league. Back in second league for the 1976–77 season, Timrå stood undefeated in all 22 games and qualified for promotion again. However, it did not last. Two one-year visits in Elitserien 1977–78 and 1981–82 ended in low results and relegation.

Many winters later, still in second league, an effort to regain the status of old times was made. On May 22, 1990, the collaboration Sundsvall/Timrå Hockey was formed with the nearby club IF Sundsvall Hockey. Still no success, and just a few years after, the joint Main/Farm team relationship was ended.

Some confusion followed when the former Timrå club was named ST Hockey during the 1994–95 season, but is since April 6, 1995 known as Timrå IK yet again.

After qualifying for the Kvalserien in 2000, the Red Eagles finally earned promotion to Elitserien on April 14, 2000, and returned to Elitserien after 18 years of absence. Almost three years later, March 1, 2003, Timrå IK played the Swedish Championship playoffs for the first time since 1974.

In the 2007–08 season Timrå IK moved up Anton Lander and Magnus Pääjärvi-Svensson from the junior teams. Despite both being only 16 years old at the time, their game was a success. They were both offered, and signed, professional hockey contracts with the club.

In the 2012–13 season, Timrå finished eleventh in the regular season and therefore had to play in the 2013 Kvalserien to stay in the top-tier league, but the team finished outside the top two spots and was relegated to the second-tier league HockeyAllsvenskan for the first time since the 1999–2000 season.

After playing five seasons in HockeyAllsvenskan, Timrå were able to earn a promotion to the SHL following the conclusion of the 2017–18 HockeyAllsvenskan season. Some of the key players during the season and the subsequent promotion playoffs were Jonathan Dahlén, Vilmos Galló, Anton Wedin and goaltender Henrik Haukeland.

Crest evolution

The crest of Timrå IK consists of a shield with two pines with the text Timrå IK spelled out in sky-blue letters at the bottom. Present shield is a contemporary interpretation of Timrå IK's earlier shields and made its debut for the 2012/2013 season when it replaced the earlier Timrå Red Eagles shield which had been in used since season 1996/1997. The current logo resembles the shield of Timrå Municipality along with Västernorrland County and has a strong local connection.

In the original shield the abbreviation of the club "WIK" (Wifstavarvs IK) is spelled out and the clubs year of inception spelled in the right corner. During the fusion with IF Sundsvall Hockey they jointly played under the name "Sundsvall Timrå Hockey" (ST Hockey) and which crest beard little resemblance to Timrå IK's former shields.

Average attendances
The table below show Timrå IK's attendances for the latest seasons in both the SHL and HockeyAllsvenskan during regular season.

Season-by-season results
This is a partial list of the last five seasons completed by Timrå IK. For the full season-by-season history, see List of Timrå IK seasons.

Players and personnel

Current roster
Updated: 4 March 2023.

Honored members

Team captains

Anders Huss (1999–2001)
Timo Peltomaa & Marcus Karlsson (2001–2002)
Håkan Åhlund (2001–2002)
Markus Åkerblom (2002–2003)
Robert Carlsson (2003–2005)
Sanny Lindström (2005–2008)
Pär Styf (2008–2011)
Elias Granath (2011–2012)
Per Hallin (2012–2016)
Andreas Molinder (2016–2017)
Hampus Larsson (2017–2019)
Emil Berglund (2019–2020)
Jonathan Dahlén (2020–2021)
Jacob Blomqvist (2021–2022)
Anton Lander (2022–present)

Head coaches

Stig Andersson (1956–1962)
Orvar Kempe (1962–1964)
Sven Lindström (1964–1967)
Verner Persson & Göte Viklund (1967–1968)
Roine Björkstrand (1968–1970)
Eje Lindström (1970–1976)
Jan-Erik Nilsson (1976–1978)
Håkan Nygren (1978–1980)
Olle Åhman (1980–1983)
Björn Pettersson & Christer Sehlstedt (1983–1984)
Håkan Pettersson & Ulf Backlund (1984–1985)
Håkan Pettersson & Christer Sehlstedt (1985–1986)
Rolf Norrbom (1986–1987)
Steven Brown (1987–1988)
Lage Edin (1988–1989)
Ulf Weinstock & Peter Crone (1989–1990)
Ulf Weinstock & Sune Bergman (1990–1991)
Ulf Weinstock & Lars-Eje Lindström (1991–1992)
Juhani Tamminen & Magnus Billman (1992–1993)
Ulf Thors & Magnus Billman (1993–1994)
Lars-Eje Lindström (1994–1998)
Peo Larsson (1998−2002)
Lars Molin (2002)
Kent Johansson (2002–2007)
Charles Berglund (2007–2010)
Per-Erik Johnsson (2010–2011)
Kent Norberg (2011–2012)
Tomas Montén (2012–2013)
Rolf Nilsson (2013–2014)
Roger Forsberg (2014–2017)
Fredrik Andersson (2017–2022)
Anders "Ante" Karlsson (2019–present)

References

External links

Official Website 
Supporterclub Website (Official Fan Club)
Discussion Forum

Swedish Hockey League teams
Ice hockey teams in Sweden
Ice hockey clubs established in 1928
Sport in Timrå
1928 establishments in Sweden
Ice hockey teams in Västernorrland County